Super Fly is the third studio album by American soul musician Curtis Mayfield, released in July 1972 on Curtom Records. It was released as the soundtrack for the Blaxploitation film of the same name. Widely considered a classic of 1970s soul and funk music, Super Fly was a nearly immediate hit. Its sales were bolstered by two million-selling singles, "Freddie's Dead" (number 2 R&B charts, number 4 Pop charts) and the title track (number 5 R&B, number 8 Pop). Super Fly is one of the few soundtracks to out-gross the film it accompanied.

Super Fly, along with Marvin Gaye's What's Going On (1971), was one of the pioneering soul concept albums, with its then-unique socially aware lyrics about poverty and drug abuse making the album stand out. The film and the soundtrack may be perceived as dissonant, since the film holds rather ambiguous views on drug dealers, whereas Curtis Mayfield's position is far more critical. Like What's Going On, the album was a surprise hit that record executives felt had little chance at significant sales. Due to its success, Mayfield was tapped for several film soundtracks over the course of the decade.

Release
Super Fly was originally released in 1972 on Curtom Records in both LP and eight-track formats. It also featured distribution in countries outside of the United States, including Italy, Germany, France, Canada, and the United Kingdom. On November 11, 1997, Rhino Records released a 25th Anniversary collection of the album with a bonus disc of demo versions of songs, radio spots, and interviews. In 1999, Rhino Records reissued the album with two bonus tracks.
On December 11, 2001, the British record label Charly Records re-released the album with several bonus tracks.

Critical reception
Music critics lauded Super Fly.

From contemporary Rolling Stones Bob Donat was favorable of Mayfield's anti-drug and self-liberation themes, and called Super Fly "not only a superior, imaginative soundtrack, but fine funky music as well and the best of Curtis Mayfield's four albums made since he left the Impressions". Rock critic Robert Christgau of The Village Voice gave the album an A- and lauded Mayfield's songwriting. Christgau also wrote that "these songs speak for (and to) the ghetto's victims rather than its achievers (cf. 'The Other Side of Town', on Curtis), transmitting bleak lyrics through uncompromisingly vivacious music. Message: both candor and rhythm are essential to our survival". Robin Katz of Disc praised the album stating to not mistake the album as a "big bad blaring instrumental LP. This is Curtis Mayfield combining a fine musical message with gentle vocals but powerful lyrics." and that the "nine tracks on the album and what never fails to amaze me is how Mayfield balances his instrumental work and lyrics without overdoing either. It is a touchy situation, but Mayfield handles it brilliantly."

In a 2004 review of the album, Rolling Stone gave Super Fly five out of five stars and cited it as Mayfield's "creative breakthrough".  John Bush of AllMusic praised the album's lyrical substance and sound, calling it a "melange of deep, dark grooves, trademarked wah-wah guitar, and stinging brass". On its significance, Bush concluded by stating:

The singer Bilal names it among his 25 favorite albums, explaining that, "I just think that's one of the best movie soundtrack albums ever. Just the way he described the whole movie, you don't even really have to see the movie, just listen to the soundtrack and you already know the whole movie. It's just killer the way he did that."

Accolades
In the Virgin Encyclopedia of Popular Music (2002), writer Colin Larkin gave the album a five-star rating. 
In 2003, VH1 named Super Fly the 63rd greatest album of all time.
The title track was selected by the Rock and Roll Hall of Fame as one of the "500 Songs that Shaped Rock and Roll".
In 2003, the album was ranked number 69 on Rolling Stone magazine's list of the 500 greatest albums of all time, 72 in a 2012 revised list, and 76 in a 2020 revised list.
The album is ranked number 986 in All-Time Top 1000 Albums (3rd edition, 2000).
In 2019, the album was selected by the Library of Congress for preservation in the National Recording Registry for being "culturally, historically, or aesthetically significant".

Track listing

Original LP
All songs were written and composed by Curtis Mayfield.

Reissues

Personnel
 Curtis Mayfield – vocals, guitar, producer
 Phil Upchurch - guitar
 Joseph Lucky Scott – bass
 Master Henry Gibson – percussion
 Tyrone McCullen – drums ("Pusherman")
 Morris Jennings – drums (all tracks except "Pusherman")
 Craig McMullen – guitar
 Roger Anfinsen – engineer
 Johnny Pate – orchestrator, arranger
 Glen Christensen – art direction
 Milton Sincoff – packaging
 Harry "Slip" Lepp – trombone

Charts

Album

Singles

See also
List of number-one albums of 1972 (U.S.)
List of number-one R&B albums of 1972 (U.S.)

Notes

References

External links
 Super Fly at Discogs
 From Super Fly to Super Star — By Ebony
 100 Best Movie Soundtracks: Super Fly at Entertainment Weekly
 Anniversary Edition: Rolling Stone review — By Robert Christgau
 Collected reviews on Superseventies.com

1972 soundtrack albums
Curtom Records albums
Curtis Mayfield soundtracks
Albums arranged by Johnny Pate
Albums produced by Curtis Mayfield
Rhino Records soundtracks
Single-artist film soundtracks
United States National Recording Registry recordings
Drama film soundtracks
United States National Recording Registry albums